Fright Nights (previously Halloween Family Fun Nights and Halloween Fright Nights) is a seasonal Halloween event held at Warner Bros. Movie World on the Gold Coast, Queensland, Australia. The event began in 2006 as Halloween Family Fun Night as a single night event and has since evolved into a major park event across a month. It features themed mazes, shows and rides.  Fright Nights (formerly Fright Nites) also refers to the Halloween special event at Thorpe Park in Chertsey, Surrey, England, which opened in 2002.

History
Fellow Gold Coast theme park, Dreamworld was the first to hold a Halloween themed night event. This event occurred once in April 2004, rather than October when Halloween actually takes place. This event has never been held since.

In 2006, Warner Bros. Movie World picked up on the idea and decided to run a single Halloween Family Fun Night held on 31 October with a Scooby-Doo theme. Due to the event being sold out, the park extended the event to become a 3-night event.

This format remained until 2009 when Movie World decided to re-theme the event to target an older audience. The park advertised "extreme experiences at this event not suitable for children". In 2010, Warner Bros. Movie World worked with Sudden Impact Entertainment and Lynton V. Harris to produce mazes based upon the Nightmare on Elm Street and Saw franchises. Sudden Impact also created the Psycho maze. On 20 September 2010, it was announced that "Freddy's Nightmare Maze will be in Show Stage, the Saw Maze will be in a custom built area behind the Wild West Falls area and the Psycho 3D Maze will be in the Scooby-Doo Spooky Coaster foyer/entrance". The SAW maze was originally due to be built in a sound stage, however, this was booked and a custom built space was built as a replacement.

Just after the conclusion of the 2010 event, it was announced that the event would return in 2011. In the middle of August 2011, Warner Bros. Movie World began to announce mazes for the 2011 event. On 1 September 2011, full details for the 2011 event were released with the event's name changing to Fright Nights. The Saw and Psycho 3D mazes from 2010 will return alongside the new Zombie Apocalypse Maze (to be located in the adjacent Studio complex) and the new Arkham Asylum Maze (to be located in the show stage).

In 2012, the event returned with new mazes and a collection of live shows. The Psycho 3D Maze, the Les Damned de Burlesque show, and the Club Blood bar all returned. New mazes included The Film Vault, The Walking Dead Maze, and Hillbilly Slasher. New shows included the Creatures of Rock, Death Derby, and Thriller Dance.

Fright Nights will return in 2013. It is scheduled to run on seven nights in October. An attraction list has been announced with a new slew of mazes and shows. Returning is Club Blood but everything else is new with two new shows, Carnevil, and Space Cowboy being the two shows for this year. Four mazes, Hillbilly Slasher 2, The Darkness, a completely revisioned The Walking Dead maze, and Evil Dead maze. All rides were open on the night except for Justice League: Alien Invasion.

One of the most popular additions to the Fright Nights line up was the Ultimate Terror Tour, a VIP behind the scenes experience / tour which occurred at an additional cost during each night of the event season. Each year, a new array of Terror Hosts would escort guests, with crowd favorite original characters such as Toxic, Seymour Graves, and Legendary Lee often returning.

Attraction history
The following table contains a list of the scare zones and shows since the event was established in 2006.

Gallery

Notes

References

External links
 

Halloween events
Recurring events established in 2006
Warner Bros. Global Brands and Experiences entertainment